Cyrtodactylus hekouensis, the Hekou bent-toed gecko, is a species of gecko endemic to Yunnan Province, China.

It was first described in 2021, in Daweishan National Nature Reserve.

References

Cyrtodactylus
Reptiles described in 2021